Department of Marine and Fisheries and the Naval Service was the department responsible for marine, fisheries and the Naval Service of Canada from 1911 to 1921.

The minister in charge was Minister of Marine and Fisheries and the Naval Service.

The department was originally the Department of Marine and Fisheries and added naval duties following the creation of NSC in 1911. In 1921, the naval component was transferred to the Department of Militia and Defence and the Naval Service and reverted to the old department name for the next decade.

Former Canadian federal departments and agencies